Potterville is a ghost town in Winfield Township, Osborne County, Kansas, United States.

History
Potterville was issued a post office in 1874. The post office was discontinued in 1903.  There is nothing left of Potterville.

References

Former populated places in Osborne County, Kansas
Former populated places in Kansas